Wayne Township, Missouri may refer to the following places:

 Wayne Township, Bollinger County, Missouri
 Wayne Township, Buchanan County, Missouri

See also

Wayne Township (disambiguation)

Missouri township disambiguation pages